American rapper Lil Nas X is the recipient of multiple awards including two Grammy Awards, five Billboard Music Awards, five MTV Video Music Awards, two BET Hip Hop Awards, two iHeartRadio Music Awards and two American Music Awards. He has also been awarded by Songwriters Hall of Fame as the youngest honoree of Hal David Starlight Award.

Lil Nas X and Billy Ray Cyrus' remix also won the Country Music Association (CMA) Awards collaboration category, CMA Music Event of the Year; Lil Nas X is the first out gay man to ever be nominated for a CMA award, and the only openly LGBTQ person to win. Vox noted the Event Award is not a part of the CMA televised celebration, and they snubbed Lil Nas X from bigger appropriate categories. The "Old Town Road" remix with Cyrus has been nominated for a People's Choice Award for Song of 2019, Lil Nas X was also nominated for "Male Artist of 2019" at the 45th People's Choice Awards. In October, at the 2019 BET Hip Hop Awards Lil Nas X, with Cyrus, won for Best Collab/Duo or Group, and Single of the Year.



Awards and nominations

Notes

References

Awards
Lil Nas X